Craig Edwards may refer to:
 Craig Edwards (Australian footballer) (born 1961), Australian rules footballer
 Craig Edwards (English footballer) (born 1982), English association footballer
 Craig Edwards (snooker player) (born 1968), English professional snooker player
 Craig Edwards (tennis) (born 1955), American professional tennis player